Barnehurst railway station serves Barnehurst, Northumberland Heath and northern parts of Bexleyheath in the London Borough of Bexley; it is  from  on the Bexleyheath line. The station stands in a cutting: the small brick-built ticket office (in a similar design to others on the line) is above the up platform.

Barnehurst was opened with the line on 1 May 1895.

Services 

The typical off-peak service in trains per hour is:
 2 tph to 
 2 tph to 
 4 tph to London Cannon Street (2tph via Bexleyheath clockwise, 2tph via Abbey Wood anticlockwise)

During the peak hours, the station is served by an additional half-hourly service between Dartford and London Charing Cross.

Connections
London Buses routes 89, 99, 229, school routes 602, 669 and night route N89 serve the station.

References

External links 

 – map sources

Railway stations in the London Borough of Bexley
Former South Eastern Railway (UK) stations
Railway stations in Great Britain opened in 1895
Railway stations served by Southeastern